Bhatti is a clan of Rajputs and Jats found in India, Pakistan and Afghanistan. The Bhattis along with Bhuttos and Bhatias claim to have originated from the Hindu Bhati Rajputs.

History 
The Bhatti tribe are first mentioned in the 14th-century Tarikh-i-Firoz Shahi by Shams Siraj Afif. (Ibbetson, Maclagan pg 101). The text records that the jungles attached to Abohar belonged to the Bhattis and the Meena during the reign of Alauddin Khalji.

Years prior to the Indian rebellion of 1857 the British East India Company assigned pioneering Jat peasants proprietary rights over forested lands frequented by the Gujjars, Bhattis, Banjaras, Passis, and other wandering pastoral groups in Delhi and western Haryana regions.

See also 
Bhattiana

References

Indian castes
Punjabi-language surnames